Coenobium or coenobia may refer to :

 Cenobitic monasticism (Cenobium, Cenobite), a monastic community in a tradition stressing communal life, as opposite to eremitism
 Coenobium (morphology), a colony of cells, notably in algae
 Coenobia (moth)